Florian Dinhopel (born 13 January 1987) is an Austrian ice hockey player currently playing for EV Zeltweg of the Austrian Elite League.

References

External links

1987 births
Austrian ice hockey forwards
Graz 99ers players
Living people
Place of birth missing (living people)